Davey Oberlin is an American musician. He is best known as the onstage keyboardist for the nu metal band Korn. Oberlin is also known for his work in symphonic deathcore group Winds of Plague.

Background
At sixteen, Oberlin drew animation in-betweens at Cartoon Network for animated television series The Powerpuff Girls. Between 2003 and 2009, Oberlin worked as a game tester at Activision, testing popular video game titles including Call of Duty, Call of Duty: World at War, Guitar Hero World Tour, X-Men Legends, 007: Quantum of Solace, and Spider-Man: Web of Shadows. Oberlin also provided the score and sound design for the mobile game hits GraveStompers and Avenged Sevenfold's Hail to the King: Deathbat, where Oberlin voiced a majority of the characters and produced several ambient themes.

Musical career

Early career
Between 2003 and 2005, Oberlin joined rocker Jennifer Finch's band The Shocker touring Europe and the United States as lead guitar and second vocals. Following his exit from the band, Oberlin formed the Orange County, California based band Perish. With Perish, Oberlin released a record produced by Paul Miner of Death By Stereo fame. Several years later, Oberlin, along with Perish, released an album exclusively in Japan. The album included the song "The Hammer," which featured guest vocals from Dave Peters of Throwdown fame.

In 2009, Oberlin joined the extreme metal band Dawn of Ashes. Oberlin co-wrote the band's album Genocide Chapters for Metal Blade Records under the stage name Volkar Kael. The band toured as opening act for Dimmu Borgir across the United States and Canada.

Following his time with Dawn of Ashes, Oberlin joined the band Stolen Babies featuring Gil Sharone of Marilyn Manson/The Dillinger Escape Plan fame. Oberlin played drums and lead guitar for the band while touring with bands including Katatonia, Sevendust, and The Devin Townsend Project.

Winds of Plague
In 2015, Oberlin joined symphonic deathcore band Winds of Plague. Oberlin played lead guitar and performed on several tours with the band before being asked to join the band Korn.

Korn
While Oberlin was working as a guitar technician for heavy metal band Avenged Sevenfold, Oberlin met Jonathan Davis and his bandmates from Korn. When keyboardist Zac Baird left Korn after a ten-year stint with the band, guitarist Brian Welch recommended Oberlin to take over as keyboardist in the band. In 2017, Oberlin officially joined the live band as Baird's replacement.  Davy is now touring with 5 Finger Death Punch ,vocals and keyboard.

All the Damn Vampires
In 2019, Oberlin created his solo synthwave project "All the Damn Vampires." On March 30, 2020, the video for his single "Saturday" was officially released.

Artwork
In addition to his music career, Oberlin is an artist and enjoys painting. He created the pop art character line the "Boneheads" and has painted pieces for attorney Bobby Samini, Bobby Schubenski, and Grammy Award winning musician Zedd.

See also 
 Korn Members
 Winds of Plague Members
 Dawn of Ashes Members

References

External links 
 Korn Official Website
 All The Damn Vampires Spotify Page

Living people
Year of birth missing (living people)
Place of birth missing (living people)
Korn members
21st-century American keyboardists
Musicians from Burbank, California
American heavy metal musicians